Tomasz Wojciech Lipiec (born 10 May 1971, in Warsaw) is a retired Polish race walker and former Polish Minister for Sport in the government of Jarosław Kaczyński.

In 1993, Lipiec has been banned for four years from professional competing in athletics due to the allegations of doping use. He was acquitted by the Polish Athletic Association after three years.

Lipiec has recently been released from prison after paying a $40K release bail, after being accused of corruption.

Achievements

References

External links
 

1971 births
Living people
Legia Warsaw athletes
Skra Warszawa athletes
Athletes from Warsaw
Polish male racewalkers
Athletes (track and field) at the 2000 Summer Olympics
Olympic athletes of Poland
Politicians from Warsaw
Polish sportsperson-politicians
Government ministers of Poland
Polish sportspeople in doping cases
 Polish politicians convicted of crimes